On 7 June 2017, Sher Bahadur Deuba got elected as the new Prime Minister of Nepal and therefore formed the new Governmental Cabinet of Nepal Deuba's candidacy was supported by the Rastriya Prajatantra Party Nepal, the Rastriya Janata Party Nepal, the Nepal Loktantrik Forum, the Federal Socialist Forum, Nepal and several small parties represented in the Nepalese Parliament after a power-sharing deal with the Communist Party of Nepal (Maoist Centre), who also supported Deuba's candidacy. After being sworn in, Deuba formed a new government in a coalition with the parties that supported his election. On 17 October 2017, in preparation for the Nepalese legislative election, the Communist Party of Nepal (Maoist Centre) decided to cooperate with the Communist Party of Nepal (Unified Marxist–Leninist). For this, all of their ministers left the cabinet after Prime Minister Deuba was prepared to dismiss them.

Ministers

See also 
 Sher Bahadur Deuba
 Fifth Deuba Cabinet, 2021
 Nepali Congress

Notes

References 

Government of Nepal
Cabinet of Nepal
2017 in Nepal
2017 establishments in Nepal
2018 disestablishments in Nepal